Hille IF is a Swedish football club located in Gävle in Gävleborg County.

Background
Hille Idrottsförening were founded in 1922.  The football section has around 500 active members, including a small league for 5–6 year olds, football school, boys and girls' teams, juniors, and two men's teams in Division III and V, and women's teams in Division IV.

Since their foundation Hille IF has participated mainly in the middle and lower divisions of the Swedish football league system.  The club currently plays in Division 3 Södra Norrland which is the fifth tier of Swedish football. They play their home matches at Hille IP in Gävle.

Hille IF are affiliated to Gestriklands Fotbollförbund.

Recent history
In recent seasons Hille IF have competed in the following divisions:

2011 – Division III, Södra Norrland
2010 – Division III, Södra Norrland
2009 – Division IV, Gästrikland
2008 – Division IV, Gästrikland
2007 – Division IV, Gästrikland
2006 – Division IV, Gästrikland
2005 – Division IV, Gästrikland
2004 – Division IV, Gästrikland
2003 – Division IV, Gästrikland
2002 – Division IV, Gästrikland
2001 – Division IV, Gästrikland
2000 – Division IV, Gästrikland
1999 – Division IV, Gästrikland

Attendances

In recent seasons Hille IF have had the following average attendances:

Footnotes

External links
 Hille IF – Official website
 Hille IF on Facebook

Sport in Gävleborg County
Football clubs in Gävleborg County
Association football clubs established in 1922
1922 establishments in Sweden